13: The Musical is a 2022 American musical coming-of-age comedy-drama film directed by Tamra Davis from a screenplay written by Robert Horn, based on the 2007 stage musical of the same name by Horn, Jason Robert Brown, and Dan Elish. The film stars an ensemble cast that includes Eli Golden, Gabriella Uhl, Frankie McNellis, JD McCrary, Lindsey Blackwell, Jonathan Lengel, Ramon Reed, Nolen Dubuc, Luke Islam, Liam Wignall, Shechinah Mpumlwana, Khiyla Anne, Kayleigh Cerezo, and Willow Moss, with Debra Messing, Josh Peck, Peter Hermann, and Rhea Perlman.

A film adaptation of 13: The Musical was officially announced in September 2019, with Davis hired as director and Horn confirmed to be adapting his and Elish's book as the screenplay. That same month, Brown was also confirmed to be returning to write new songs for the film, and Christopher Lennertz was hired to compose the film's incidental score. The cast was filled out between October 2020 and April 2021, including Golden, Uhl, McNellis, McCrary, Blackwell, Lengel, Messing, Perlman, Hermann, and Peck. Principal photography took place between June and August 2021.

13: The Musical premiered at the Paris Theater in New York City on August 8, 2022, and was released through Netflix on August 12.

Plot
Evan Goldman is forced to move from New York City to his grandmother’s house in Walkerton, Indiana, when his parents go through a divorce ("Thirteen"). He befriends the next door neighbor, Patrice ("The Lamest Place in the World"), and her friend Archie, who is a wheelchair user.

Faced with his upcoming Bar Mitzvah, Evan aims to befriend the popular kids at his new school, led by football star Brett Sampson and head cheerleader, Kendra Duncan, but this alienates him from Patrice, who is considered a dork by the popular kids and sees Evan wanting to befriend them as a betrayal. Things aren’t better at home, with Evan resenting both his parents for the divorce and move and his mother Jessica lamenting giving up her writing career for her marriage, only for it to fail anyway.

Brett and Kendra are crushing on each other and want to share their first kiss together ("I’ve Been Waiting"), but Kendra’s best friend Lucy also likes Brett, and is fed up with always being outshone by Kendra ("Opportunity"). When Evan comes up with a plan to trick Kendra’s overbearing mother and get her and Brett on a date to the movies ("The Bloodmaster"), Lucy threatens him to prevent the two from kissing or she will get everyone to boycott Evan’s party.

To prevent the kiss without angering Brett directly, Evan recruits Archie, who has a huge crush on Kendra, to sit next to her at the movies to ruin the mood. Archie is fine with this, despite knowing Evan is using him ("Getting Ready"), but Patrice learns and calls Kendra’s mother with the truth, causing her to storm in and ruin the date.  This backfires on her when such an act alienates her from both Archie and Evan, who is blamed and shunned. Lucy makes her move and kisses Brett, claiming him as her boyfriend.

Lucy proves to be a clingy overbearing girlfriend to Brett, whose friends pity his sad state ("Bad Bad News"). Evan and Jessica reconcile over the disappointing turns their lives have taken ("It Would Be Funny"), and Evan finally calls his father, who apologizes and encourages him to fix his mistakes. He convinces Brett to apologize to Kendra, with help from Patrice ("Tell Her").  Brett and Kendra reconcile, and he dumps Lucy.  Evan and Patrice apologize to each other, and Evan asks her to come to his Bar Mitzvah.

The morning of the party, Patrice is convinced to forgive Evan by a gift Evan leaves at her house, and goes to the service, which is also attended by Brett and Kendra and their friends, including Lucy, who apologizes and makes up with Kendra. Evan completes his service, and everyone sings that they have "A Little More Homework to Do" while flashes show Jessica and Evan moving into a house of their own, Evan being friends with both Brett and Kendra, and Patrice and Archie with understanding on both sides, Jessica resuming her writing career, and Archie getting a new crush. The whole cast has an epic party afterwards, with a performance of "A Brand New You".

Cast

 Eli Golden as Evan
 Gabriella Uhl as Patrice
 JD McCrary as Brett
 Lindsey Blackwell as Kendra
 Frankie McNellis as Lucy
 Jonathan Lengel as Archie
 Ramon Reed as Eddie
 Nolan Dubuc as Malcolm
 Luke Islam as Carlos
 Shechinah Mpumlwana as Cassie
 Khiyla Aynne as Charlotte
 Willow Moss as Zee
 Kayleigh Cerezo as Molly
 Liam Wignall as KC
 Peter Hermann as Joel
 Josh Peck as the Rabbi
 Rhea Perlman as Ruth
 Debra Messing as Jessica

Production 
On August 12, 2014, CBS Films acquired the rights to adapt 13, with Bert V. Royal writing the script and Laurence Mark, Bob Boyett and David Blackman producing the film. On September 20, 2019, Netflix and producer Neil Meron acquired the film, with Tamra Davis hired to direct and Robert Horn writing the script instead of Royal. On April 29, 2021, Davis was set to produce the film with Jason Robert Brown, Horn, Bob Boyett and Mark Nicholson.

On October 28, 2020, Neil Meron issued an open casting call for the teen roles, with rehearsals set to begin in March 2021. On April 29, 2021, Eli Golden, Gabriella Uhl, JD McCrary, Frankie McNellis, Lindsey Blackwell, Jonathan Lengel, Ramon Reed, Nolen Dubuc, Luke Islam, Shechinah Mpumlwana, Kayleigh Cerezo, Wyatt Moss, Liam Wignall, and Khiyla Aynne were cast in the film. On May 24, 2021, Debra Messing was cast in the film. On June 11, 2021, Rhea Perlman, Josh Peck, and Peter Hermann joined the cast.

On October 28, 2020, principal photography was set to begin in Toronto in June 2021. Filming also took place in various locations like New York City, Beeton and Brampton (Ontario, Canada). The principal photography ended on August 6, 2021.

Music
On September 20, 2019, Brown was hired to write new songs for the film. In July 2022, Christopher Lennertz was hired to compose the film's incidental underscore.

The songs appear in the film in the following order:

 "13” – Evan, Cast
 "The Lamest Place in the World” – Patrice
 "I’ve Been Waiting”† – Kendra, Brett, Cast
 "Opportunity” – Lucy, Charlotte, Cassie, Molly, Cast
 "The Bloodmaster”† – Evan, Lucy, Brett, Kendra, Cassie, Malcolm, Cast
 "Getting Ready" – Archie, Evan, Cast
 "Bad Bad News" – Eddie, Malcolm, Carlos, KC, Cast
 "It Would Be Funny"† – Evan, Jessica
 "Tell Her" – Evan, Patrice, Brett, Malcolm, Eddie, Zee, Carlos, KC, Cast
 "Evan’s Haftorah" – Evan
 "A Little More Homework" – Evan, Patrice, Kendra, Lucy, Brett, Zee, Cast
 "Brand New You" – Molly, Carlos, Cassie, Cast

† New song written for film

The film also features “Cyclical Safire,” written and performed by Gary Schreiner.

Release
The film was released through Netflix on August 12, 2022.

Reception
The film received mixed reviews from critics, with praise for its music and the performances of the cast, but criticism for its deviations from the stage musical.

References

External links
 
 13: The Musical on Netflix

2022 films
2022 comedy-drama films
2020s musical films
2020s coming-of-age comedy films
2020s coming-of-age drama films
American musical comedy-drama films
American children's films
American children's musical films
American coming-of-age films
English-language Netflix original films
Films about children
Films about divorce
Films about Jews and Judaism
Films about friendship
Films based on musicals
Films directed by Tamra Davis
Films scored by Christopher Lennertz
Films set in New York City
Films set in Indiana
Films shot in New York City
Films shot in Toronto
2020s English-language films
2020s American films